, formerly known as , is a Japanese singer-songwriter. She debuted in 2002 with the independently released single . She is most well known for singing the ending theme song for the anime adaptation of the Namco role-playing video game Tales of the Abyss, "Bōken Suisei."

Biography 
Enomoto was born in Nagoya. She first gained an interest in music in late primary school. She joined the school band in her final year, and started listening to top 40-charts based Western music. She was particularly impressed by Madonna, though also liked such music as hard-rock bands. She wrote her first song on the piano in this period. It was called  and it expressed much of the unhappiness she felt at the time. She later resumed writing songs regularly when she was 19.

Two years later in August 2002, Enomoto released her first single, "Moeru Taiyō," under the independent label Nagare Records with the mononym . It was sold exclusively at six Tower Records stores, and managed to chart at No. 3 on the Sapporo store's instore independent single charts, as well as No. 8 on the total single charts at the Nagoya Kintetsu Pass'e store. In December of the same year, she debuted under SME Records as a major label artist. The first song she'd ever written, "Maboroshi," was released as her debut single, followed by "Color Ningen" in June. Neither single charted on Oricon charts' top 200 singles chart. After performing at a few live events throughout 2003, Enomoto ceased activity under Sony.

Enomoto did no musical activities in 2004, and in late 2005 released another independent single, "Yasashii Uta o Utaitai," under her full name. This led to her second major-label contract, this time with For Life Music. She re-debuted with the single "Kokoro no Katachi". Her music was most popular on Nagoya-based FM radio stations: her singles "Kokoro no Katachi" and "Uchiage Hanabi" reached #3 on the ZIP-FM airplay charts, and her third, "Rainbow Dust," reached No. 1. "Rainbow Dust" was used as the theme song for the drama Sweets Dream. These were followed by her debut album, Notebook I: Mirai no Kioku.

From October 2007 until February 2008, Enomoto released three singles, released successively every two months. The last of these, "Mirai Kinenbi," shared the title of Enomoto's cellphone serialised novel, released through cellphone site Orion at the same time as the single. The offer for Enomoto to write such a novel came to a surprise to her, as she was not an avid fiction reader, and did not consider herself to be an exceptional writer.

Enomoto's break came in late 2008, when she teamed up with Bump of Chicken vocalist Motoo Fujiwara to write the ending theme song for the anime adaptation of the Namco role-playing video game Tales of the Abyss. The resulting song was "Bōken Suisei," which went on to reach No. 10 on Oricon's singles chart, selling over 30,000 copies.

Discography

Studio albums

Extended plays

Singles

References

External links 
 Official For Life Music Label Site
 Former Official Sony Music Site

Sony Music Entertainment Japan artists
Living people
Japanese pop musicians
Japanese women pop singers
Japanese women singer-songwriters
Japanese singer-songwriters
1981 births
People from Nagoya
Musicians from Aichi Prefecture
21st-century Japanese singers
21st-century Japanese women singers